T. Velmurugan  Tamil Nadu (India) politician and Member of the Legislative Assembly of Tamil Nadu. He was elected to the Tamil Nadu legislative assembly as a Pattali Makkal Katchi candidate from Panruti constituency in 2001, and 2006 elections. He is the founder of the party Tamizhaga Vazhvurimai Katchi (TVK).

Political career 
Velmurugan is the founder of Tamizhaga Vazhvurimai Katchi.

Velmurugan was a part of Pattali Makkal Katchi (PMK) and was the joint general secretary of the party and two-time MLA of PMK party. Velmurugan started TVK party on January 15, 2012 on Pongal festival by hosting his party flag. Velmurugan said that he may keep an alliance with any party. He confirmed that "We are not opposed to any political party and we will make a change in Indian political system".

Tamizhaga Vazhvurimai Katchi
Tamizhaga Vazhvurimai Katchi is a political party in the state of Tamil Nadu. It was founded by former PMK MLA Panruti T. Velmurugan. This is one of the political parties in Tamil Nadu, which organizes various agitations for the issues of Tamils. The Gangaikondan police registered a case against Panruti T. Velmurugan and 32 other cadres of the TVK after the agitation organized by them against the upcoming unit of Pepsi at the SIPCOT Industrial Growth Centre in Gangaikondan on 27 October 2015.

References 

Living people
People from Cuddalore district
Year of birth missing (living people)
Tamil Nadu MLAs 2021–2026